Professor Derek Crowther FRCP, FRCR (born 1937) is a British oncologist, and Professor Emeritus, School of Medical Sciences, University of Manchester.

Crowther was educated at University of Cambridge and studied medicine at St Bartholomew's Hospital, graduating in 1963.

In 1973, he became the first Professor of Medical Oncology at the Christie Cancer Centre, University of Manchester.  He was the second professor of medical oncology in the UK (the first being Gordon Hamilton Fairley).  He retired in 1997.

He served as chair of the Leukaemia Research Fund Clinical Trials Advisory Panel, and president of the Association of Cancer Physicians.

He is a foundation scholar at Clare College, Cambridge.

He was a member of the United Kingdom government's Gene Therapy Advisory Committee, which first convened in November 1993. In June 2015 he came to public attention, when one of his patients, who had been given six months to live, 40 years earlier, was eighty years old.

References

External links 

 
 

Place of birth missing (living people)
Fellows of the Royal College of Radiologists
Fellows of the Royal College of Physicians
1937 births
Living people

British oncologists